Valley Christian Academy (VCA) is a preK-12 private Christian school located in Santa Maria, California.

In September 2021, the school and its sponsoring congregation, First Baptist Church, were sued in federal court by the parent of a female football player at Cuyama Valley High School over allegations of sex discrimination. The plaintiff claimed that VCA's refusal to play CVHS because the latter had a female team member constituted a violation of Title IX as well as California Interscholastic Federation bylaws allowing female students to compete on teams with males.

References

Christian schools in California
High schools in Santa Barbara County, California
1967 establishments in California